BoxGroup is an investment fund company based in New York City. The company was founded in 2007 by David Tisch, grandson of entrepreneur Laurence A. Tisch, and Adam Rothenberg.

BoxGroup invests in the pre-seed and seed rounds of financing for early-stage companies. One of the financing companies they have invested in, is Ramp, a corporate card start-up.  The venture capital fund invests in start-up technology business in many sectors including  marketplaces, e-commerce, SAAS, and financial tech.

BoxGroup was among the top three most active United States-based micro venture capital firms in 2014. The company was listed in Poet & Quants "Top 20 Investors Behind MBA Startups" and has more than 230 investments startup companies including Vine, Groupme, Warby Parker and Behance.

References

Financial services companies established in 2007
Companies based in New York City
Micro venture capital firms of the United States